The African United Democratic Party is a political party in Eswatini. The party supports social-liberal principles, and is in favor of replacing the country's absolute monarchy with a Prime Minister acting as head of government, while the monarch remains as a traditional figurehead and head of state.

References

2005 establishments in Swaziland
Centrist parties in Africa
Liberal parties in Africa
Political parties established in 2005
Political parties in Eswatini
Social liberal parties